This is a list of rivers of Mexico, listed from north to south. There are 246 rivers on this list. Alternate names for rivers are given in parentheses.

Rivers flowing into the Gulf of Mexico

Río Bravo, the name of the Rio Grande in Mexico
San Juan River
Pesquería River
Salinas River
Salado River
Sabinas Hidalgo River
Candela River
Sabinas River
Conchos River
Chuviscar River
Sacramento River
San Pedro River
Florida River
Parral River
Balleza River (San Juan River)
San Fernando River (Conchos River)
Soto La Marina River (Santander River)
Purificación River
Pánuco River
Tamesí River (Guayalejo River)
Chicayán River
Santa Maria River (Tamuín River) (Tampoán River)
Río Verde
Moctezuma River
Tempoal River
Amajac River
Extoraz River
Tula River
Tuxpan Ver (Tuxpan River)
Pantepec River
Vinazco River
Cazones River
Tecolutla River
Necaxa River
Nautla River
Bobos River
Actopan River
Antigua River (Pescados River)
Jamapa River 
Cotaxtla River (Atoyac River)
Blanco River (Río Blanco)
Papaloapan River
San Juan River
Lalana River
Trinidad River
Tesechoacan River
Playa Vicente River
Tonto River
Amapa River
Santo Domingo River
Salado River (Zapotitlán River)
Río Grande
Valle Nacional River
Coatzacoalcos River
Uspanapa River (Uxpanapa River)
Jaltepec River
Sarabia River
El Corte River
Tonalá River (Pedregal River)
Grijalva River (Tabasco River) (Río Chiapa)
Usumacinta River
San Pedro y San Pablo River (distributary)
Palizada River (distributary)
San Pedro River
Lacantún River
Jataté River
Tzaconejá River
Salinas River (Chixoy River)
Tulija River
Chilapa River
Tacotalpa River
Teapa River
La Venta River 
Encajonado River
Suchiapa River
Santo Domingo River
Cuilco River
Chumpan River
Candelaria River
Mamantel River
Champotón River
Hondo River
Blue Creek

Rivers flowing into the Pacific Ocean

Tijuana River 
Las Palmas River
San Vicente River
San Antonio River
Del Rosario River
San Andres River
Soledad River
Arroyo Salado River
Colorado River
Hardy River
Gila River
Santa Cruz River
San Pedro River
Sonoyta River
Concepción River (Magdalena River)
Altar River
Sonora River
San Miguel River (Horcasitas River)
Mátape River (Malapo River)
Yaqui River
Moctezuma River
Sahuaripa River
Bavispe River (Bavisque River) 
Rio San Bernardino
Rio Fronteras
Rio Agua Prieta
Arroyo Cajón Bonito
Aros River
Mulatos River
Tutuaca River
Sirupa River
Tomochic River
Papigochic River
Mayo River
Fuerte River
Rio Cuchujaqui
Choix River
Río Verde, a.k.a. San Miguel River, Sinforeza River
Urique River
San Ignacio River, a.k.a. Recowata River
Batopilas River
Chínipas River
Septentrion River
Cerocahui River
Oteros River
Uruachi River
Tepochique River
Mochomo River
Huachajuri River
Arroyo Monterde
Sinaloa River (Mohinora River)
Culiacán River
Humaya River
Tamazula River
San Lorenzo River
Piaxtla River
Elota River
Presidio River
Baluarte River
Teacapan Estuary
Acaponeta River
Río San Pedro Mezquital
Animas River
Río Grande de Santiago
Mololoa River
Huaynamota River (Jesús María River)
Atengo River (Chapalagana River)
Huajimic River
Camotlán River
Bolaños River
Colotlán River
Jerez River
Mezquitic River
Juchipila River
Calvillo River
Río Verde (Río San Pedro)
Los Lagos River
Calderón River
Lake Chapala
Lerma River
Turbio River
Guanajuato River
Apaseo River
Laja River
Zula River
Huaracha River
Duero River
Ameca River
Mascota River
Atenguillo River
Remus River
Tomatlán River
San Nicolás River
Purificación River
Chacala River (Cihuatlán River)
Armería River (Ayuquila River) (Ayutla River)
Tuxpan River (Coahuayana River)
Coalcomán River
Aguililla River
Balsas River (Mezcala River) (Atoyac River) 
Tepalcatepec River (Río Grande)
Cupatitzio River (Del Marques River)
Río del Oro
Cutzamala River
Ixtapan River
Temascaltepec River
Bejucos River
Amacuzac River
Yautepec River
Tlapaneco River
Nexapa River
Mixteco River
Acatlán River
San Martín River
Zahuapan River
Atoyac River
Papagayo River
Omitlán River
Ometepec River
Quetzala River
Río Verde
Atoyac River
Atoyaquillo River (Putla River)
Colotepec River
Copalita River
Tehuantepec River (Quiechapa River)
Tequisistlán River
Suchiate River

Endorheic basins
Salton Sea in California
New River (Río Nuevo)

Guzmán Basin in northern Chihuahua
Casas Grandes River
Santa Maria River
Carmen River (Santa Clara River)

Bolsón de Mapimí
Aguanaval River
Trujillo River
Nazas River (Río del Oro)
Sextín River
Ramos River (Santiago River)
Tepehuanes River

See also
 List of rivers of the Americas by coastline

References

Atlas of Mexico, 1975
The Prentice Hall American World Atlas, 1984.
National Geographic Atlas of the World, 1992.
Rand McNally, The New International Atlas, 1993.
The Columbia Gazetteer of North America, 2000.
MSN Encarta World Atlas, 2008
, GEOnet Names Server

External links 

Mexico
Rivers